Life 24 was a British television channel owned and operated by Life TV Media, it was the second television channel from the company. Life TV Media had also launched three other channels to complement Life 24; Life TV, Life Showcase TV and Life One. It was launched on 24 July 2006. and closed on 20 August 2007

On 20 August 2007 Life 24 and two of its other sister channels were closed down and integrated into the channel Life One. The Channel Four Television Corporation bought their three Sky Digital EPG slots and moved their own channels to the slots.

Satellite television
Television channels in the United Kingdom
Defunct television channels in the United Kingdom
Television channels and stations established in 2000
Television channels and stations disestablished in 2007